Fabio Conforto (13 August 1909 – 24 February 1954) was an Italian mathematician. His contributed to the fields of algebraic geometry, projective geometry and analytic geometry.

References

External links
 

1909 births
1954 deaths
20th-century Italian mathematicians
Sapienza University of Rome alumni